École secondaire Georges-P.-Vanier is a French first language high school located in the Westdale Village district in Hamilton, Ontario, Canada. It serves the French language population of Brant, Haldimand, Norfolk, Halton, Hamilton-Wentworth, and Wellington counties.

The school also has a theatre group, Les Petits Géants, that has won multiple awards at the Sears Theatre Festival. The theatre group had the honour of presenting its plays in St-Malo, France and in Sicily.

École secondaire Georges-P.-Vanier celebrated its 40th anniversary in 2014.

See also 
CSDCSO
Georges Vanier
List of high schools in Ontario

References

External links 

French-language high schools in Ontario
High schools in Hamilton, Ontario